The Premier League Goal of the Season is an annual football award for the player deemed to have scored the best goal in the preceding Premier League season.

The shortlist features each of the season's nine Premier League Goal of the Month winners and on occasion, such as in 2016–17 and 2018–19, a goal from May which does not have a monthly vote. The winner is decided by a combination of an online public vote — which contributes to 10% of the final tally — and a panel of experts.

The award was first given following the 2016–17 season and, since 2019–20, has been known by its sponsored name, the Budweiser Goal of the Season; the award had been previously sponsored by Carling for its first three iterations. In 2020, the Premier League backdated the award and named a winner for every season since its inception.

Winners 

The following awards were retrospectively given, dating back to the Premier League's founding season.

See also 
 BBC Goal of the Season
 Premier League Goal of the Month

Notes

References 

Goal of the Season
Goal of the Season
Association football player non-biographical articles
Association football goal of the year awards